Andrés Manuel Pila Solano (born May 11, 1991) is a Colombian competitive archer. A lone male archer on the Colombian team at the 2016 Summer Olympics, Pila has collected a total of four medals throughout his five-year international archery career, including a bronze in the men's individual recurve at the 2014 South American Games in Santiago, Chile.

Pila was selected to compete for Colombia in the men's individual recurve at the 2016 Summer Olympics in Rio de Janeiro, Brazil. Sitting at forty-third position from the initial stage of the competition with 654 points, Pila lost his opening round match to the hard-charging Malaysian and London 2012 quarterfinalist Khairul Anuar Mohamad, who managed to get past him through a comfortable 6–0 challenge.

References

External links
 

Colombian male archers
Living people
People from Córdoba Department
1991 births
Olympic archers of Colombia
Archers at the 2016 Summer Olympics
South American Games silver medalists for Colombia
South American Games bronze medalists for Colombia
Central American and Caribbean Games gold medalists for Colombia
Central American and Caribbean Games bronze medalists for Colombia
South American Games medalists in archery
Competitors at the 2014 South American Games
Competitors at the 2018 South American Games
Competitors at the 2018 Central American and Caribbean Games
Archers at the 2019 Pan American Games
Pan American Games competitors for Colombia
Central American and Caribbean Games medalists in archery
20th-century Colombian people
21st-century Colombian people